John L. Hopper is an Australian genetic epidemiologist and professor at the University of Melbourne, where he is a Professorial Fellow and Director of the Centre for Epidemiology and Biostatistics in the School of Population Global Health. He is also a National Health and Medical Research Council (NHMRC) Senior Principal Research Fellow, and was one of the first nine Australia Fellows chosen by the NHMRC in 2007. Since 1990, he has been the director of Twins Research Australia (formerly the Australian Twin Registry).

References

External links
Faculty profile

Living people
Australian geneticists
Australian epidemiologists
Genetic epidemiologists
Monash University alumni
La Trobe University alumni
Academic staff of the University of Melbourne
Statistical geneticists
Australian statisticians
Year of birth missing (living people)